Callisia navicularis is a species of flowering plant in the family Commelinaceae. It has gained the Royal Horticultural Society's Award of Garden Merit as a warm temperate greenhouse ornamental.

References

navicularis
Garden plants of North America
Endemic flora of Mexico
Flora of Northeastern Mexico
Flora of Southwestern Mexico
Flora of Central Mexico
Flora of Veracruz
Plants described in 1983